Chrysolina bankii is a species of leaf beetle native to western Europe and the western Mediterranean Basin (including Macaronesia). It has also been introduced to the US, where its range is expanding.  

Chrysolina banksi adults are 8.0-10.7 mm in length. They are metallic bronze in color, with orange-brown legs. Their elytra have puncture marks. They feed on numerous types of leaves, but especially those in Asteraceae and Lamiaceae.

References

External links
Images representing Chrysolina at BOLD

Chrysomelinae
Beetles described in 1775
Taxa named by Johan Christian Fabricius
Beetles of Europe
Fauna of Macaronesia